Richard Charles Thompson  is a marine biologist who researches marine litter. At the University of Plymouth he is director of the Marine Institute; professor of Marine Biology; and leads the International Marine Litter Research Unit. Thompson coined the term "microplastics" in 2004.

Education
Thompson was educated at University of Newcastle and the University of Liverpool where he was awarded a Ph.D in 1996.

Career and research
Thompson's paper, Lost at Sea: Where is All the Plastic?, published in the journal Science in 2004, was the first to use the term microplastics, which has since become common parlance.

Since 2010 he has been professor of Marine Biology at the University of Plymouth. Since 2018 he has also been director of the Marine Institute, part of the School of Biological and Marine Sciences at the University. He also leads the University's International Marine Litter Research Unit.

Publications
Thompson, Richard. (2006). Plastics. In: Dominant Wave Theory. By Andrew Hughes. Pp. 112–116. London: Booth-Clibborn, 2006. . New York: Abrams, 2007. .
"Marine Strategy Framework Directive: TaskGroup 10 Report: Marine Litter." Luxembourg: Publications Office of the European Union, 2010. Galgani, F., Fleet, D., van Franeker, J., Katsanevakis, S., Maes, T., Mouat, J.Oosterbaan, L., Poitou, I., Hanke, G., Thompson, R.,  Amato, E., Birkun A., and Janssen, C. .
Marine Debris as a Global Environmental Problem: Introducing a solutions based framework focused on plastic: A STAP Information Document: November 2011. Washington, DC: Scientific and Technical Advisory Panel, Global Environment Facility, 2011. Richard C. Thompson, Bruce E. La Belle, Hindrik Bouwman, and Lev Neretin. Thompson was lead author.
Impacts of Marine Debris on Biodiversity: Current status and Potential Solutions. CBD Technical Series No. 67. Montreal: Secretariat of the Convention on Biological Diversity; Scientific and Technical Advisory Panel—GEF, 2012. . Thompson was lead author.
Readman, J.W., DeLuna, F. Ebinhaus, R., Guzman, A.N., Price A.R.G., Readman, E.E. Sheppard, A.L.S., Sleight, A.S. Strum, R. Thompson, R.C. Tonkin, A.Wolschke, H., Wright, R., and Sheppard, R.C. (2013) Coral Reefs of the World.
Thompson, R.C. (2013) Plastics, Environment and Health. In: Accumulation: The Material Politics of Plastics. Edited by Gabrys, J., Hawkins, G. and Michael, M. Hardback: Routledge, 2013. . Paperback: Routledge, 2017. . Pp. 150–169.

Awards and honours
2016: Marsh Award for Marine and Freshwater Conservation from the Zoological Society of London and Marsh Christian Trust
2018: Order of the British Empire (OBE) in the 2018 New Year Honours for services to marine science
 2020: Elected a Fellow of the Royal Society (FRS) 
 Volvo Environment Prize (2022)

References

Date of birth missing (living people)
Place of birth missing (living people)
Living people
Alumni of Newcastle University
British marine biologists
Academics of the University of Plymouth
Fellows of the Royal Society
Year of birth missing (living people)
Officers of the Order of the British Empire